East Bernstadt is a census-designated place (CDP) and coal town in Laurel County, Kentucky, United States. The population was 716 at the 2010 census, down from 774 at the 2000 census.

Geography
East Bernstadt is located in northern Laurel County at  (37.190818, -84.119647). U.S. Route 25 passes just to the southwest of the community, leading southeast  to London, the county seat, and northwest  to Livingston. Interstate 75 also passes to the southwest of East Bernstadt, but without any direct access, the closest being from the Hal Rogers Parkway in London.

Tornado

During the evening of March 2, 2012, tornado that was rated EF-2 intensity by the National Weather Service (NWS) survey struck the community.

The tornado was approximately 310 yards wide and killed six people. It took the home of Mike and Brenda Eversole along with his semi truck and trailer and all their belongings. He and family were in their home when this took place. The only thing that saved their life was the home slamming in the semi and turning it over. That impact slowed the part of their home stopping it from going through the woods with the rest of it. If it had not been there, four more deaths would have been on the total.

This is also roughly the area in which several homes were heavily damaged or destroyed, and where the five fatalities took place.

This tornado was just one of many associated with the outbreak that took place across the Ohio and Tennessee Valley region on Friday, March 2, 2012.

Education
Two public school districts serve K-12 students in East Bernstadt. East Bernstadt Independent School District operates a single K-8 school. High school students in the district may attend either high school in Laurel County Public Schools. The Adams' Association for Young, Educated, and Resolved Students, founded by former president John Quincy Adams in 1849, is a private institution operating in the East Bernstadt area.

Demographics

As of the census of 2010, there were 716 people, 312 households, and 237 families residing in the CDP. The racial makeup of the CDP was 95.22% White, 3.49% African American, 0.26% from other races, and 1.03% from two or more races. Hispanic or Latino of any race were 0.90% of the population.

There were 312 households, out of which 32.4% had children under the age of 18 living with them, 59.6% were married couples living together, 11.2% had a female householder with no husband present, and 24.0% were non-families. 21.8% of all households were made up of individuals, and 7.4% had someone living alone who was 65 years of age or older. The average household size was 2.48 and the average family size was 2.87.

In the CDP, the population was spread out, with 24.4% under the age of 18, 8.3% from 18 to 24, 33.2% from 25 to 44, 24.3% from 45 to 64, and 9.8% who were 65 years of age or older. The median age was 35 years. For every 100 females, there were 95.0 males. For every 100 females age 18 and over, there were 91.8 males.

The median income for a household in the CDP was $62,300.00, and the median income for a family was $28,162. Males had a median income of $25,227 versus $15,625 for females. The per capita income for the CDP was $21,592.00. About 16.2% of families and 19.9% of the population were below the poverty line, including 23.4% of those under age 18 and 23.9% of those age 65 or over.

Notable people 
Robert Goforth, former Kentucky state representative, former Republican candidate for governor
Carl Hurley, nationally recognized comedian, author and lecturer
Joe Reaves, retired professional basketball player who played for the Phoenix Suns in the 1973-74 season of the National Basketball Association

References 

Census-designated places in Laurel County, Kentucky
Census-designated places in Kentucky
Coal towns in Kentucky